Konjski Vrh is a dispersed settlement in the Municipality of Luče in Slovenia. The area belongs to the traditional region of Styria and is now included in the Savinja Statistical Region.

References

External links
Konjski Vrh on Geopedia

Populated places in the Municipality of Luče